The 2013–14 Copa del Rey was the 4th staging of the Copa del Rey de Futsal. The competition began on October 8, 2013 with First round matches. The Final was played on 3 May at Bilbao Arena, Bilbao.

Barcelona Alusport won its fourth Copa del Rey title after defeating ElPozo Murcia 4–3 in the Final held in Bilbao, and remains as the only winners of Copa del Rey since its inception in 2010–11 season.

Calendar

Qualified teams
15 clubs of Primera División
10 clubs of Segunda División
13 clubs of Segunda División B

First round
Draw was held on Friday, August 30. Matches to be played on 8/9 and 12 October 2013.

All times are CEST.

|}

Matches

Round of 32
Draw took place on October 16 at 12:00 at RFEF headquarters. Round of 32 draw includes the five winners from the first round plus all Primera División and Segunda División teams.

Matches to be played from 3 to 6 November 2013.

|}

Matches

Round of 16
Round of 16 draw took place on November 13 at RFEF headquarters. This round draw includes the 16 winners from the Round of 32 which in summary are nine teams from Primera División, four from Segunda División and three from Segunda División B.

Matches to be played on 10/11/12 and 18 December 2013.

All times are CET.

|}

Matches

Final stages

Quarter finals
Quarter-finals draw took place on December 19, 2013, at the RFEF headquarters.

Matches to be played on 18 and 19 February 2014.

All times are CET.

Matches

Semi finals

First leg matches to be played on 31 March and second leg matches on 7/8 April.

All times are CEST.

Matches

1st leg

2nd leg

Final
The final took place on 3 May at the Bilbao Arena in Bilbao, Basque Country.

Top goalscorers
Last updated: 3 May. Players in bold are still active in the competition.

Source: own compilation

See also
2013–14 Primera División de Futsal
2013 Copa de España de Futsal

References

External links
lnfs.es

Copa del Rey de Futsal seasons
Copa
Fut